Camel Up is a board game for two to eight players. It was designed by Steffen Bogen and illustrated by Dennis Lohausen, and published in 2014 by Pegasus Spiele. Players place bets on a camel race in the desert; the player who wins the most money is the winner of the game. Camel Up won the Spiel des Jahres in 2014.

In 2015, an expansion called Camel Up: Supercup was released, allowing the game to be played with up to 10 players. A mobile app was also released in 2015 for Android and iOS devices.

At Essen 2018, a German board game convention, Eggertspiele released a second edition of the game with new artwork by Dennis Lohausen and Chris Quilliams, and revised game rules.

Awards 
 2014 Spiel des Jahres winner

References

External links 
 
 Camel Up (Second Edition) at BoardGameGeek
 Camel Up 2.0 on Eggert Spiele's website 
 Camel Up Review – Tom'S Epic Gaming

Spiel des Jahres winners
Board games introduced in 2014